The Fox Chase Branch, formerly the Newtown Branch, is a railway line in the state of Pennsylvania. The oldest part of it was built in 1876 by the Philadelphia, Newtown and New York Railroad. It was part of the Reading Company system from 1879 until 1976. Today it is owned by SEPTA and hosts the Fox Chase Line commuter rail service.

History 
The Philadelphia, Newtown and New York Railroad's initial line branched off the Connecting Railway (now the Northeast Corridor) near Erie Avenue, and ran almost due north to Olney and across the Tacony Creek to Cheltenham and Fox Chase. The Pennsylvania Railroad controlled the line at the beginning, and contemplated extending it across the Delaware River to create a new through route between Philadelphia and New York City, although this never occurred. Service began on June 14, 1876. The company further extended the line  from Fox Chase to Newtown on February 4, 1878.

The Philadelphia and Reading Railroad leased the line on November 12, 1879, ending the Pennsylvania Railroad's involvement with the company. The plan at the time was to build a connecting branch west from Olney to a junction with the Tabor Branch near Wayne Junction and route passenger trains to the Philadelphia, Germantown and Norristown Railroad depot at Ninth and Green. This did not happen immediately, so trains from the Newtown Branch continued down the North Pennsylvania Railroad's main line to that railroad's depot at Third and Berks. The planned link with the Tabor Branch was built in 1892. Post re-routing, the original part of the branch south of Olney was designated the Olney Branch.

The Reading proceeded with its own faster New York to Philadelphia route in 1904–1906 with the building of the New York Short Line. The Newtown Branch was double-tracked between Newtown Junction and Cheltenham Junction as part of this effort. The new line opened on May 27, 1906. Administratively, the Newtown Branch's southern terminus was cut back to Cheltenham Junction once the New York Short Line opened.

The Philadelphia, Newtown and New York Railroad was one of twelve railroads merged into the Reading Company effective December 31, 1945. The Newtown Branch was the last of the Reading's suburban branches to be electrified. The city of Philadelphia funded the effort through the Passenger Service Improvement Corporation (PSIC), and the branch was electrified to Fox Chase, the last station within the city limits, on September 29, 1966. Diesel operation continued north of Fox Chase to Newtown.

With the Reading Company's final bankruptcy in 1976, the Newtown Branch was conveyed to SEPTA. SEPTA suspended the diesel service to Newtown on July 1, 1981, as part of a systemwide discontinuation of non-electrified service. SEPTA ran a modified version of the diesel service, called the Fox Chase Rapid Transit Line, between October 5, 1981, and January 18, 1983. The right-of-way beyond Fox Chase is mostly preserved.  within Montgomery County was converted into the Pennypack Trail. Another  in Bucks County was converted into the Newtown Rail Trail in 2022.

The remaining line between Cheltenham Junction and Fox Chase became known as the Fox Chase Branch, and SEPTA continues to operate the Fox Chase Line commuter rail service over it. The former New York Short Line became part of Conrail's Trenton Line, with SEPTA and Conrail sharing the track between Cheltenham Junction and Newton Junction. Beginning in 1989 that double-tracked portion was functionally split, with each operator using one track. The two lines were physically separated in 2004–2005. SEPTA activated positive train control on the Fox Chase Line on May 23, 2016.

Notes

Footnotes

References

External links 
 

SEPTA Regional Rail lines
Railway lines opened in 1876
Rail infrastructure in Pennsylvania
Reading Company lines